Boccaccio, oder Der Prinz von Palermo (Boccaccio, or the Prince of Palermo) is an operetta in three acts by Franz von Suppé to a German libretto by Camillo Walzel and Richard Genée, based on the play by Jean-François Bayard, Adolphe de Leuven, Léon Lévy Brunswick and Arthur de Beauplan, based in turn on The Decameron by Giovanni Boccaccio. Despite the opera's clear links to the Viennese opera tradition, Suppé's opera takes most of its style from Italian opera.

The opera was begun somewhere around the fall of 1878 and first published in 1879 by the August Cranz company and performed at the Carltheater, Vienna, on 1 February 1879. An English translation and adaptation was completed in 1880 by Dexter Smith and later by Oscar Weil and Gustav Hinrichs around 1883. The first contemporary edit of the work occurred in 1950 for the premiere of the work at the Metropolitan Opera in New York City, with several more iterations occurring through the 20th century.

In 1936, the first filmed version of the work was made. In 1940, Boccaccio was made into a film by American-born Italian film director Marcello Albani.

Performance 
Following its premiere in 1883, the opera quickly made its way around the globe, touching almost every continent on the Earth. 

 April 23, 1880: New York 
 February 3, 1882: Brussels, Belgium (based on translation by Gustave Lagye)
 March 29, 1883: Paris, France (Théâtre des Folies-Dramatiques)
 May 1, 1882 to 1929: Parma, Italy (Teatro Reinach)
 September 16, 1882: Vienna, Austira (Theater an der Wien)
 1882: London, United Kingdom (Comedy Theatre)
 September 2, 188(3 or 4): Melbourne, Australia
 December 26, 1884: Brno, Czech Republic
 October 11, 1886: Manaus, Amazonos (Éden-Theatro)
 July 5, 1889: Vienna, Austria (Venedig in Wien)
 1897: Manaus, Amazonos (Amazonas Theater)
 1898: Rome, Italy (Costanzi Theater, based on translation by Gian Luigi Bonelli)
 1905: (Broadway ft. Raymond Hitchcock)
 1922: Venice, Italy (La Fenice)
 1931: Metropolitan Opera House, New York (ft. Maria Jeritza)
 1932 - 1953: Vienna, Austria (Wiener Staatsoper ft. Maria Jeritza)
 1935: Turin, Italy (Teatro Regio, conducted by Franco Ghione ft. Iris Adami Corradetti)
 1950, 1958, 1973: Berlin, Germany (Metropoltheater)
 1951: Vienna, Austria (Burgtheater)
 1956: Munich, Germany (Gärtnerplatztheater)
 1970: Florence, Italy (Teatro Comunale di Firenze ft. Fedora Barbieri, Alvinio Misciano, and Mario Petri)
 1976: Bordeaux, France (Grand Théâtre de Bordeaux)
 2015/2016: Hildesheim, Germany (Theater für Niedersachsen)

Roles and role creators

Synopsis
Time: 1331.
Place: Florence.
In early-Renaissance Florence, the erotic novellas of the poet Boccaccio cause a stir and the locals are divided into the female fans of his scandalous tales and their jealous husbands. A plot is hatched by the husbands to chase Boccaccio from the city and have him locked up. But Boccaccio has other plans, including one to win the hand of the Duke's daughter Fiammetta, which he finally succeeds in doing after finding favour with the Duke.

Arias, duets, and ensembles
"Ich sehe einen jungen Mann dort stehn" (Boccaccio)
"Hab' ich nur deine Liebe" (Fiametta, later with Boccaccio)
Act 1 Finale (book-burning)
Serenade (Boccaccio, Pietro, Leonetto)
Cooper's Song (Lotteringhi)
Waltz trio "Wie pocht mein Herz so ungestüm" (Fiametta, Isabella, Peronella)
Lovers' sextet
Duet "Florenz hat schöne Frauen (Mia bella florentina)" (Fiametta, Boccaccio)
Act 3 Finale (Boccaccio's counsel)

References

Further reading
Lamb, Andrew (1992), "Boccaccio" in The New Grove Dictionary of Opera, ed. Stanley Sadie (London)

External links

Synopsis at music.yodelout.com

1879 operas
Operas based on works by Giovanni Boccaccio
The Decameron
Operas by Franz von Suppé
German-language operettas
Operas
Operas based on plays
Operas set in Florence
Operas about writers